The Nashville A-Team was a nickname given to a group of session musicians in Nashville, Tennessee, USA, who earned wide acclaim in the 1950s, 1960s, and early 1970s. They backed dozens of popular singers, including Elvis Presley, Eddy Arnold, Patsy Cline, Jim Reeves, Bob Dylan, Moon Mullican, Jerry Lee Lewis, Brenda Lee, and others.

The Nashville A-Team's members typically had backgrounds in country music but were highly versatile. Examples of their jazz inclinations can be found in the Nashville All-Stars album with Chet Atkins titled After the Riot at Newport, the Hank Garland LP entitled Velvet Guitar, Tupper Saussy's Said I to Shostakovitch, Kai Winding's Modern Country, Gary Burton's Tennessee Firebird and Chester and Lester by Chet Atkins and Les Paul.

In 2007, The Nashville A-Team was inducted into the Musicians Hall of Fame and Museum in Nashville.

Members 
Notable members of "The Nashville A-Team" included:
 Bassists: Bob Moore, Ernie Newton, Henry Strzelecki, Junior Huskey, Joe Zinkan, Norbert Putnam, Floyd "Lightnin' " Chance, Joe Osborn, Michael Rhodes 
 Drummers: Buddy Harman, Jerry Carrigan, Farris Coursey, Doug Kirkham, Larrie Londin (1970s), Kenny Buttrey
 Keyboardists: Floyd Cramer, Hargus "Pig" Robbins, Owen Bradley, Bill Pursell, David Briggs, Steve Nathan
 Guitarists: Chet Atkins, Grady Martin, Hank Garland, Ray Edenton (also mandolin, ukulele, and banjo), Harold Bradley, Velma Williams Smith,  Paul Yandell, Pete Wade, Jerry Kennedy, Norman Blake, Jimmy Capps, Spider Wilson, Fred Carter Jr., Billy Sanford, Joe South, Wayne Moss, Jimmy Colvard, Chip Young, Reggie Young
 Fiddle: Tommy Jackson, Johnny Gimble, Buddy Spicher, Dale Potter, Vassar Clements, Brenton Banks
 Steel guitar: Pete Drake, Jerry Byrd, Buddy Emmons, Ralph Mooney, Lloyd Green, Buck West, Shot Jackson, Jerry Kennedy, Maurice Anderson, Hal Rugg, Weldon Myrick, Little Roy Wiggins, Walter Haynes 
 Banjo: Earl Scruggs, Buck Trent, Sonny Osborne, Bobby Thompson
 Mandolin: Jethro Burns
 Saxophone: Boots Randolph
 Percussion: Farrell Morris, Sam Bacco
 Harmonica: Charlie McCoy (also keyboards, brass, percussion and guitar), Jimmy Riddle  
 Harp: Mary Alice Hoepfinger
 Backing singers: The Jordanaires, The Anita Kerr Singers, The Nashville Edition

References

External links 
 Bob Moore’s Nashville A-Team website

1950s establishments in Tennessee
1970s disestablishments in Tennessee
American session musicians
American instrumental musical groups
Musical groups from Nashville, Tennessee